Nobel Academy Higher Secondary School is an educational institution located in Baneswor, Kathmandu. With the motto: "Nobel the virtue of education and health," Nobel Academy was established in 1998 by the collaboration of Surendra Shrestha , Navaraj Panday , Uttam Vaukaji and others. Nobel Academy Higher Secondary School is one of the institutions under Nobel Foundation, that includes Nobel College, Nobel Hospital and other health centers around the country. It previously also owned Nobel Medical College in Biratnagar, which is still running under a different management. The name "Nobel" is inspired from inventor Alfred Nobel.

Nobel Academy is a private institution that gives the HSEB courses of the Nepal Government. Nobel Academy gives the HSEB course also known as 10+2 program only in the Faculty of Science and Management. 
This academy has a fully equipped computer lab, Science lab and sports facility.

References

Schools in Kathmandu
Educational institutions established in 1998
1998 establishments in Nepal